Dolabella is a genus of sea slugs or sea hares, marine opisthobranch gastropod mollusks in the family Aplysiidae, the sea hares.

Description
In the sea hares of the genus Dolabella the back end of the body has turned into a slanted disc-like shield, with a large, calcified shell buried inside. The color is variable, with specks of green and brown.

There are fossil records of † Dolabella aldrichi from the Early Miocene, found in the Chipola Formation in Florida

Species
Species within the genus Dolabella include:

 † Dolabella aldrichi
 Dolabella auricularia Lightfoot, 1786 or Wedge Sea Hare
 Dolabella gigas Rang, 1828
Distribution : Indian Ocean.
Description : The internal shell has a saucer-shaped extension; armed penis
Species brought into synonymy
 Dolabella aldrichi Dall, 1890 †: synonym of Floribella aldrichi (Dall, 1890) † (original combination)
 Dolabella andersoni Allan, 1941: synonym of Dolabella auricularia (Lightfoot, 1786)
 Dolabella callosa Lamarck, 1801: synonym of Dolabella auricularia (Lightfoot, 1786) 
 Dolabella cheni Sun, 1960: synonym of Dolabella auricularia (Lightfoot, 1786) 
 Dolabella dolabrifera Rang, 1828: synonym of Dolabrifera dolabrifera (Rang, 1828)
 Dolabella ecaudata (Rang, 1828): synonym of Dolabella auricularia (Lightfoot, 1786) 
 Dolabella fragilis Lamarck, 1822: synonym of Aplysia depilans Gmelin, 1791
 Dolabella gigas (Rang, 1828): synonym of Dolabella auricularia (Lightfoot, 1786) 
 Dolabella hasselti Férussac in Rang, 1828: synonym of Dolabella auricularia (Lightfoot, 1786) 
 Dolabella laevis Blainville, 1819: synonym of Aplysia depilans Gmelin, 1791 
 Dolabella lepus Risso, 1826: synonym of Aplysia depilans Gmelin, 1791 (dubious synonym)
 Dolabella rumphii Blainville, 1819: synonym of Dolabella auricularia (Lightfoot, 1786) 
 Dolabella scapula O'Donoghue, 1929: synonym of Dolabella auricularia (Lightfoot, 1786)  (non-binomial)
 Dolabella variegata Pease, 1860: synonym of Dolabella auricularia (Lightfoot, 1786)

References

External links
 

Aplysiidae
Gastropod genera
Taxa named by Jean-Baptiste Lamarck